Sidley Wood is a  biological Site of Special Scientific Interest north of Andover in Hampshire.

Other trees are oak, field maple, ash and hazel.

References

 
Sites of Special Scientific Interest in Hampshire